Eric Baković  is a linguist and professor in the Department of Linguistics at the University of California, San Diego with a specialization in phonology. He is also affiliated with the Center for Research on Language (CRL), the Interdisciplinary Program in Cognitive Science, and the Center for Iberian and Latin American Studies (CILAS). He earned his BA in 1993 in linguistics from the University of California, Santa Cruz and completed his PhD under the supervision of Alan Prince at Rutgers in 2000 (with the dissertation Harmony, Dominance and Control).

Baković has made contributions to the study of phonology in Optimality Theory (OT), particularly in the areas of assimilation, opacity, and efforts to replace rule-ordering systems with ones that comply with the monostratal architecture of OT.

He was an occasional contributor to the Language Log from 2004 to 2017 and was the recipient of a UCSD Distinguished Teaching Award in 2006. He also managed the Rutgers Optimality Archive from 1996 to 2014.

See also
Vowel harmony

References

External links
Eric Baković's webpage

Linguists from the United States
Phonologists
University of California, Santa Cruz alumni
University of California, San Diego faculty

Living people

Year of birth missing (living people)